Puywanniyuq (Quechua puywan heart of an animal, -ni, -yuq suffixes, "the one with a heart", also spelled Puyhuanniyocc) is a mountain in the Andes of Peru, about  high. It is situated in the Ayacucho Region, Víctor Fajardo Province, Sarhua District, southwest of Sarhua.

References

Mountains of Peru
Mountains of Ayacucho Region